In modern English usage, the informal term idiot-proof or  foolproof describes designs that cannot be misused either inherently, or by use of defensive design principles. The implication is that the design is usable even by someone of low intelligence who would not use it properly.

The term "foolproof" originates in 1902. The term "idiot-proof" became popular in the 1970s. It may have been invented as a stronger-sounding version of foolproof, as the force of foolproof had declined due to frequent usage. Perhaps for the same reason, "foolproof" is now a formal term, whereas "idiot-proof" remains informal.

Several Murphy's law adages claim that idiot-proof systems cannot be made, for example "Nothing is foolproof to a sufficiently talented fool" and "If you make something idiot-proof, someone will just make a better idiot." Along those lines, Douglas Adams wrote in Mostly Harmless, "a common mistake that people make when trying to design something completely foolproof is to underestimate the ingenuity of complete fools".

See also

 Defensive design
 Hanlon's razor
 Inherent safety
 Murphy's law
 Poka-yoke
 Unintended consequences

References

Phrases